Károly Grecsák (15 November 1854 - 17 December 1924) was a Hungarian politician and jurist, who served as Minister of Justice between 1917 and 1918. He was a representative of the Moderate Opposition from 1881 to 1891. He was the founder and an editor of the first German language oppositional newspaper, the Budapester Tageblatt. From 1891 he worked as a judge for the Court of Szeged, later moved to Budapest to the Court. After the ministership he became a lawyer in the capital city. He was the founder and chairman of the Party of Hungarian Order which functioned from 1920 to 1922.

References
 Magyar Életrajzi Lexikon

1854 births
1924 deaths
Justice ministers of Hungary